Allen Jonathan Moore (born January 27, 1958) is a distinguished research professor in the Department of Entomology at the University of Georgia, where he also serves as associate dean for research in the College of Agricultural and Environmental Sciences. He was previously the head of the university's department of genetics in the Franklin College of Arts and Sciences. He served as editor-in-chief of the Journal of Evolutionary Biology from 2007 to 2011, and he has been editor-in-chief of the open access journal Ecology and Evolution since 2011. In 2012, he was named a fellow of the American Association for the Advancement of Science.

References

External links
Faculty page

Living people
1958 births
People from Jackson, Michigan
American geneticists
University of Georgia faculty
American entomologists
Fellows of the American Association for the Advancement of Science
Academic journal editors
University of Kentucky faculty
Arizona State University alumni
University of Colorado Boulder alumni